This is a list of canceled nuclear reactors in the United States.

History
The late 1960s and early 1970s saw a rapid growth in the development of nuclear power in the United States.  By 1976, however, many nuclear plant proposals were no longer viable due to a slower rate of growth in electricity demand, significant cost and time overruns, and more complex regulatory requirements.  Also, there was considerable public opposition to nuclear power in the US by this time, which contributed to delays in licensing planned nuclear power stations, and further increased costs.

By the end of the 1970s it became clear that nuclear power would not grow nearly as dramatically as once believed.  This was particularly galvanized by the Three Mile Island accident in 1979. Eventually, more than 120 reactor orders were ultimately cancelled and the construction of new reactors ground to a halt. Al Gore has commented on the historical record and reliability of nuclear power in the United States:

Of the 253 nuclear power reactors originally ordered in the United States from 1953 to 2008, 48 percent were cancelled, 11 percent were prematurely shut down, 14 percent experienced at least a one-year-or-more outage, and 27 percent are operating without having a year-plus outage. Thus, only about one fourth of those ordered, or about half of those completed, are still operating and have proved relatively reliable.

A cover story in the February 11, 1985, issue of Forbes magazine commented on the overall management of the nuclear power program in the United States:

The failure of the U.S. nuclear power program ranks as the largest managerial disaster in business history, a disaster on a monumental scale ... only the blind, or the biased, can now think that the money has been well spent. It is a defeat for the U.S. consumer and for the competitiveness of U.S. industry, for the utilities that undertook the program and for the private enterprise system that made it possible.

During the 2000s, aging infrastructure, growing power use and fears of global climate change all prompted what was then called the "nuclear renaissance". Engineering companies noted that the commissioning process was a major barrier to further construction, and changes to the system were carried out by the US Nuclear Regulatory Commission as part of the Energy Policy Act of 2005, along with new tax incentives and loan guarantees. As many as 30 new reactors were planned by 2009.

, only two new reactors are still under construction, both at Vogtle. The project has announced significant delays and budget overruns. Most of the other new builds and the equally extensive list of upgrades to existing reactors have been shelved. The majority of this change in fortunes is due to the rapidly falling prices of natural gas.

Cancelled nuclear reactors

 "Model" column key: "B&W" is Babcock & Wilcox; "CE" is Combustion Engineering; "GA" is General Atomics; "GE" is General Electric; "GEH" is GE Hitachi Nuclear Energy; and "WH" is Westinghouse.

See also

 Prospective nuclear units in the United States

Notes

References

External links
 Cancelled Nuclear Units Ordered in the United States

Nuclear history
Nuclear power in the United States
 
Nuclear technology-related lists
-Nuclear, cancelled